Chris Combs may refer to:

 Chris Combs (composer) (born 1983), American composer, arranger, steel guitarist and producer
 Chris Combs (American football) (born 1976), American football player